Wesley Ed Hills (born June 5, 1995) is an American professional gridiron football running back for the New Orleans Breakers of the United States Football League (USFL). He played college football for Delaware and Slippery Rock (PA). He signed with the Arizona Cardinals as an undrafted free agent in 2019 and played for the Detroit Lions of the National Football League (NFL) and Hamilton Tiger-Cats of the Canadian Football League (CFL).

Early years
Hills attended and played high school football at Wildwood High School.

College career

Delaware
As a true freshman in 2013, Hills played in all 12 games for the Delaware Fightin' Blue Hens football team. He had 10 rushing attempts for 81 yards and a touchdown. He had 172 carries for 952 yards and six touchdowns, along with nine receptions for 53 yards in 2014. In the first game of the 2015 season, he had 16 carries for 88 yards before suffering a season-ending foot injury in the game.

In 2016, he played in seven games with five starts at running back and had 88 carries for 728 yards and seven touchdowns. In a game against Maine on October 8, he rushed for a career-high 242 yards and two touchdowns and was named Colonial Athletic Association Offensive Player of the Week for his efforts. He missed most of five games during the season with an injury. He earned third-team All-Colonial Athletic Association honors on November 22, 2016. Hills was declared academically ineligible for the 2017 season on August 2, 2017.

Slippery Rock
Hills transferred to Division II Slippery Rock University of Pennsylvania on February 7, 2018, after his Division I eligibility expired. In 2018, he had 246 carries for 1,714 yards and had 28 receptions for 193 yards. His 1,714 rushing yards broke the single-season school record for rushing yards. Hills earned first-team All-Pennsylvania State Athletic Conference Western Division honors on November 14, 2018. He was named to the second-team Associated Press Division II All-America team on December 12, 2018.

In January 2019, Hills was selected to play in the NFLPA Collegiate Bowl, where after rushing for 78 yards and a touchdown, he was named game MVP. He was also selected to play in the 2019 Senior Bowl, where he had two carries for 22 yards in the game before leaving with an injury.

Professional career

Arizona Cardinals
Hills signed a three-year, $1.75 million contract with the Arizona Cardinals as an undrafted free agent on May 10, 2019. He was waived with an injury settlement during final roster cuts on August 31, 2019.

Detroit Lions
On October 9, 2019, Hills was signed to the Detroit Lions' practice squad. He was released from the practice squad on October 19, but re-signed to the practice squad on October 23. He was promoted to the active roster on December 14, 2019. He scored his first two career touchdowns on one-yard runs in a 38–17 loss to the Tampa Bay Buccaneers on December 15, 2019. Hills was waived on August 17, 2020, but re-signed with the team three days later. He was waived on September 5, 2020.

Hamilton Tiger-Cats
Hills signed with the Hamilton Tiger-Cats of the CFL on March 12, 2021 and spend most of two seasons on the practice roster. He became a free agent upon the expiry of his contract on February 14, 2023.

New Orleans Breakers
On February 17, 2023, it was announced that Hills had signed with the New Orleans Breakers of the United States Football League (USFL).

References

External links
Detroit Lions bio
Slippery Rock football bio
Delaware Fightin' Blue Hens football bio

1995 births
Living people
People from Wildwood, New Jersey
Players of American football from New Jersey
American football running backs
Delaware Fightin' Blue Hens football players
Slippery Rock football players
Sportspeople from Cape May County, New Jersey
Arizona Cardinals players
Detroit Lions players
Hamilton Tiger-Cats players
New Orleans Breakers (2022) players